The 1962–63 season was Cardiff City F.C.'s 36th season in the Football League. They competed in the 22-team Division Two, then the second tier of English football, finishing tenth.

Following relegation the previous year and a poor start to the season, manager Bill Jones was replaced by George Swindin.

Players

League standings

Results by round

Fixtures and results

Second Division

League Cup

FA Cup

Welsh Cup

See also
Cardiff City F.C. seasons

References

Welsh Football Data Archive

Cardiff City F.C. seasons
Cardiff City F.C.
Card